Roger Taylor may refer to:

Roger Taylor (Queen drummer) (born 1949), drummer for Queen
Roger Taylor (Duran Duran drummer) (born 1960), drummer for Duran Duran
Roger Taylor (author), author of epic fantasy Hawklan series
Roger Taylor (college president), former president of Knox College in Galesburg, Illinois
Roger Taylor (tennis) (born 1941), British tennis player
Roger Taylor (American football) (born 1958), American football player
Roger Taylor (photographic historian) (born 1940), curator and photographic historian

See also
Roger Tayler (1929–1997), British astronomer